Sofia Quaglioni is a nuclear physicist. She is Deputy Group Leader at the Nuclear Data and Theory Group in the Nuclear and Chemical Sciences Division in Lawrence Livermore National Laboratory (LLNL).

Biography
Quaglioni completed her undergraduate degree from the University of Trento, Italy, and then PhD from the same institution in 2005. She was then a postdoctoral fellow at the University of Arizona. She joined LLNL in 2006.

Honours and awards
2011 Early Career Award Winner, United States Department of Energy
2019 Fellow of the American Physical Society for "contributions to unifying theories for the structure and dynamics of light nuclei by elucidating the role of the continuum in weakly bound nuclei, and the inclusion of three-body final states and three-nucleon interactions within reaction dynamics."

Publications

References

External links

https://www.youtube.com/watch?v=ZVWVAgWWnJg

Living people
Nuclear physicists
Women nuclear physicists
University of Trento alumni
Lawrence Livermore National Laboratory staff
University of Arizona alumni
Fellows of the American Physical Society
Year of birth missing (living people)
21st-century physicists
21st-century women scientists